This is a List of World Championships medalists in sailing.

List of World Championships medalists in sailing (centreboard classes)
List of World Championships medalists in sailing (juniors and youth classes)
List of World Championships medalists in sailing (keelboat classes)
List of World Championships medalists in sailing (multihull classes)
List of World Championships medalists in sailing (windsurfer classes)
List of World Championships medalists in sailing (yacht classes)
List of World Championships medalists in sailing (radio sailing classes)

See also
World championships in sailing